Dennis Gibson may refer to:

 Dennis Gibson (American football) (born 1964), former American football linebacker
 Dennis Gibson (academic) (born 1942), British-born Australian academic and mathematician